William Joseph Dalton (11 March 1876 – 14 December 1955) was an Australian rules footballer who played for the Fitzroy Football Club in the Victorian Football League (VFL).

A dual premiership player, Dalton played beside his younger brother Jack in Fitzroy's 1898 premiership team and was a half forward flanker in the premiership the following season.

References

Holmesby, Russell and Main, Jim (2007). The Encyclopedia of AFL Footballers. 7th ed. Melbourne: Bas Publishing.

1876 births
Fitzroy Football Club players
Fitzroy Football Club Premiership players
1955 deaths
Australian rules footballers from Melbourne
Two-time VFL/AFL Premiership players